The 1996 Poland Masters was a professional non-ranking snooker tournament, which took place between 28 and 31 May 1996 at the Atelier Snooker Club in Warsaw, Poland. Gerard Greene won the tournament defeating Patrick Wallace 6–5 in the final.

Results

Group stage
Players in bold progressed to knockout stage

Group 1

Group 2

Group 3

Group 4

Knockout stage

References

1996 in snooker
Sport in Poland